XHSV-FM is a Mexican college radio station owned by the Universidad Michoacana de San Nicolás de Hidalgo. It is known as Radio Nicolaita and broadcasts on 104.3 MHz in Morelia.

History
XHSV began as XESV-AM 1370, obtaining its permit on February 12, 1974. Installation work began in 1975 for the new station.

The station migrated to FM in 2011 as XHSV-FM 104.3.

External links
Radio Nicolaita Facebook

References

Radio stations in Michoacán
University radio stations in Mexico